Ana Abraído-Lanza is an American behavioral psychologist who is a professor at the New York University. Her research considers the cultural and structural factors that impact mental and physical health amongst Latino communities. She serves as Vice Dean of the School of Public Health.

Early life and education 
Abraído-Lanza was an undergraduate student in psychology at New York University. She moved to City University of New York for graduate studies, where she earned a master's degree and doctorate. Her doctoral research considered the social role identity, support and psychological wellbeing amongst Hispanic women. After graduating, Abraído-Lanza joined the Columbia University Mailman School of Public Health, where she worked as a postdoctoral scholar in Medical Epidemiology.

Research and career 
Abraído-Lanza was appointed Professor of Sociomedical Sciences at the Columbia University Mailman School of Public Health and oversaw the Initiative for Maximizing Student Development (IMSD), which looked to increase the number of people from historically underrepresented groups studying medicine. The program launched a doctoral training scheme in 2008. At Columbia, she was selected as a Provost Leadership Fellow.

Abraído-Lanza joined the New York University School of Public Health in 2018. Her research considers the cultural and structural factors that impact mental and physical health amongst Latino communities, including the Latino mortality paradox - despite their socioeconomic status, Latino people have lower mortality rates than non-Latino white people. Unlike the majority of public health frameworks, Abraído-Lanza considers the positive aspects of culture that give rise to these lower mortality rates. She has shown that structural racism, in particular conditional citizenship and subjective sense of belonging, impacts the health and wellbeing of immigrants.

Awards and honors 
 2008 Dalmas A. Taylor Distinguished Contributions Award 
 2013 Provost Leadership Fellow

Selected publications

References 

Living people
Year of birth missing (living people)
New York University alumni
City University of New York alumni
New York University faculty
American women psychologists
21st-century American women